Changdao County ) was a county in Yantai, a prefectural area of Shandong in the People's Republic of China. It consists of the Changshan Islands within the Bohai Strait, directly north of Penglai. They were known for their sandy beaches and picturesque limestone cliffs. In 2020, Changdao County was merged to Penglai county-level city and became Penglai District.

Geography

The Changshan Islands, also known as the Temple Islands or Miaodao Archipelago are an archipelago of 32 islands located across the southern portion of the Bohai Strait, the waterway connecting the Bohai Sea to the Yellow Sea, collectively named after the two largest islands.  In Chinese, they are also known as the "Long Islands", and anciently as the "Sandy Gate Islands".

Administrative divisions
Changdao County has jurisdiction over one subdistrict, one town and six townships:
 Nanchangshan Subdistrict 南长山街道 South Changshan Subdistrict
 Tuojizhen Town 砣矶镇
 Beichangshan Township 北长山乡 North Chang Mountain Township
 Heishan Township 黑山乡 (Black Mountain Township)
 Daqindao Township 大钦岛乡 (Greater Qin Island Township)
 Xiaoqindao Township 小钦岛乡 (Lesser Qin Island Township)
 Nanhuangcheng Township 南隍城乡 (South Huangcheng Township)
 Beihuangcheng Township 北隍城乡 (North Huangcheng Township)

Islands
There are 32 islands in Changshan Islands, and 10 of them have permanent residential settlements. These islands were mostly formed by Proterozoic low-grade metamorphic rocks, with smaller amounts of Tertiary igneous rocks and Quaternary sedimentary rocks.

Climate

Demographics
Ten of the islands were occupied, and there were twenty-two uninhabited islands, some little more than sand spits. There is one large town, Tuoji Town (砣矶镇, population 8,495) and seven smaller towns with forty villages, with a total population in the county of 52,000.

Economy
The major occupation was aquaculture, producing products such as sea cucumbers, abalone, sea urchins, bivalves, kelp, scallops, prawns and fish.  Tourism is also important; many of the villages sport resort hotels.

Transportation
The islands were regularly served by both a passenger and vehicle Roll On, Roll Off ferry from Penglai. There was a small military airport on the largest island, South Changshan Island.

Tourism
Both Changdao National Forest Park and Changdao National Nature Reserve were located on the islands, which were on a cross-Bohai Sea flyway.

Temple Island got its name from the large number of temples that were built there. Xianying Palace is a temple that was built during the Northern Song dynasty, starting in 1122. It was originally a Taoist temple to the sea goddess Matsu, but became Buddhist later. At the present time the local government has restored the temple to its Ming dynasty appearance, although many additions had been made during the Qing.

Changdao Island was previously closed to non-Chinese nationals. Westerners found on the island were swiftly taken to the passenger ferry terminal and placed on the next ferry back to Penglai by the islands Police service. Islanders promptly reported all "outsiders" to the islands police service. Police explained the reasons for this was due to the high number of military installations on the Island. The Changdao Islands were now open to non-Chinese nationals, including westerners. This was agreed by the local and national governments as of 1 December 2008.

References

External links
 Official Changdao County website 
 Changdao website from Yantai IDB development corporation 

Nature reserves in China
County-level divisions of Shandong
Islands of Shandong
Island counties of China
Bohai Sea
Yantai